SAV may refer to: 

 SAV Creation, designers of the 1995 Rollin video game
 SAV Studios, London, England, where Easy Cure recorded
 Spektrum Akademischer Verlag, a former German publisher later known as Springer Spektrum
 Stormartillerivagn m/43, a 1943 Swedish tank
 Schweizerische Aktuarvereinigung, the Swiss Association of Actuaries
 Slovenská akadémia vied, the Slovak academy of sciences
 Sozialistische Alternative, a German Trotskyist organisation 
 Start of active video, in ITU-R BT.656 digital video
 Satisfaction approval voting

Places 
 Savannah/Hilton Head International Airport, IATA code
 Savannah (Amtrak station), Amtrak code
 Stratford-upon-Avon railway station code
 Savanna-la-Mar, Westmoreland parish, Jamaica

Sav may refer to:
 Sav Bhandari, a character in Degrassi: The Next Generation
 Sav Killz, a Wu-Tang Clan affiliate
 Sav Remzi, a record producer 
 Sav Rocca (b1973), an Australian sportsman
 Önder Sav, a Turkish politician
 Sav., taxonomic author abbreviation of Ludovic Savatier (1830–1891), French naval doctor and botanist
 Salvador (Sav), a protein kinase in the Hippo signaling pathway
 .sav or .SAV, file extensions, often for saved states, including:
 a Parallels Workstation saved state
 MEM.SAV, in Atari DOS
 a CorVision programming language file
 an executable RT-11 file
 an abbreviation of save or saving:
 Sav-A-Center, supermarkets, New Orleans, Louisiana metropolitan area, US
 Sav-a-Lot, supermarkets
 A colloquial name for a saveloy sausage
 A slang abbreviation for "still a virgin" coined by Grammy-nominated rapper Jack Harlow in his song of the same title